Sir Jeffrey Carlton Astwood  (1907−1997) was speaker of the House of Assembly of Bermuda. He was also commanding officer of the Bermuda Rifles and first commanding officer of the new Bermuda Local Forces (a battalion-level headquarters company with supporting subunits for the Bermuda Militia Artillery and the Bermuda Rifles).

References 

Bermudian soldiers
United Bermuda Party politicians
Knights Bachelor
Members of the Parliament of Bermuda
1907 births
1997 deaths